Çınarcık is a town and district of Yalova Province in the Marmara region of Turkey. The mayor is Numan Soyer. (AK Party).

Çınarcık has a permanent population of 18,000 but its location near İstanbul has made it a popular location for summer homes. On hot weekends during the summer, the population can swell to 300,000 and construction of new summer homes in the town is fast-paced.

Çınarcık is located on a small strip of flat land on the coast with mountains rising sharply in back of it.  This environment is very common among cities on the northern coast of Turkey.  Cınarcık provides a number of vacation activities including camping, hiking, and beaches.  Most of the coastline of Çınarcık is rocky but the western end has sand beaches with several restaurants.  The beaches are not of high quality by Turkish standards as there is a considerable amount of seaweed and jellyfish in the surf, though the jellyfish do not sting.  The nightlife can be lively during the summer, due to the large number of İstanbulites staying there.  The largest club is Club Kio.

References

External links
 District governor's official website 

Seaside resorts in Turkey
Populated places in Yalova Province
Fishing communities in Turkey
Populated coastal places in Turkey
Districts of Yalova Province